Reset is an album by Panda Bear and Sonic Boom (the respective stage names of Noah Lennox and Peter Kember). It marks the duo's first collaborative album; Kember had previously co-produced Lennox's Tomboy (2011) and Panda Bear Meets the Grim Reaper (2015).

Composition
Much of the album is built on a bedrock of sampled loops taken from the intros of various 1950s and 1960s pop songs, with Panda Bear and Sonic Boom sharing vocal duties on top of these.

Release
The album was released on August 12, 2022, through Domino Recording Company. 

In a positive review for Pitchfork, Daniel Felsenthal wrote that the album was "the most pleasurable release" of both Lennox and Kember's career. He added, "Less palliative than corrective, Reset is a dose of human lightness in the drudgery of the now." Writing for AllMusic, Fred Thomas noted that "There's a sense that the heightened collaborative element takes the pressure off of both artists, and the songs sound like two old friends joyfully exchanging ideas and toying with the possibilities of their sound." In a mixed review, Thomas Bedenbaugh of Slant Magazine opined that the album "revels in the whimsical sounds of ‘50s and ‘60s pop and rock but lacks the memorable songwriting that made much of the best music from that era so indelible."

Track listing

Charts

References

2022 albums
Collaborative albums
Panda Bear (musician) albums